Étienne Lestringant is a contemporary French tenor specialising in the baroque repertoire.

Biography 
Étienne Lestringant was one of the first members of the baroque ensemble Les Arts Florissants convened by William Christie in Autumn 1979.
During the 1980s he was one of the pillars of this ensemble, which was then the spearhead of the baroqueux movement, alongside Agnès Mellon, Jill Feldman, Guillemette Laurens, Monique Zanetti, Dominique Visse, Michel Laplénie, Philippe Cantor, Gregory Reinhart, François Fauché, Antoine Sicot etc.

More recently, he founded the "Ensemble vocal Frédéric Chopin", a group of amateur singers open to students of the Frédéric Chopin Conservatory of Paris and adults from outside the community.

Discography (selection)

With Les Arts Florissants 
 1980: Filius Prodigus H.399 by Marc-Antoine Charpentier
 1981: Pastorale sur la Naissance de N.S. Jésus-Christ H.483 by Marc-Antoine Charpentier
 1981: Altri Canti by Claudio Monteverdi
 1982:  H.414 by Marc-Antoine Charpentier
 1982: Oratorios (Il pecator pentito, O Cecità del misero mortale) by Luigi Rossi
 1982: Antienne "O" de l'Avent by Marc-Antoine Charpentier
 1983: Il ballo delle ingrate by Claudio Monteverdi
 1984: Airs de cour (1689) by Michel Lambert
 1986: Dido and Aeneas by Henry Purcell (L'Esprit)

References

External links 
 Étienne Lestringant, La voix chorale ou le chant multiplié on Anaclase
 Étienne Lestringant on MemOpéra
 Etienne Lestringant on IMDb

French operatic tenors
French choral conductors
French male conductors (music)
French music educators
Year of birth missing (living people)
Place of birth missing (living people)
Living people
21st-century French conductors (music)
21st-century French male musicians